The 10th Critics' Choice Awards were presented on January 10, 2005, honoring the finest achievements of 2004 filmmaking.

Top 10 films
(in alphabetical order)

 The Aviator
 Collateral
 Eternal Sunshine of the Spotless Mind
 Finding Neverland
 Hotel Rwanda
 Kinsey
 Million Dollar Baby
 The Phantom of the Opera
 Ray
 Sideways

Winners and nominees

Best Picture Made for Television
The Life and Death of Peter Sellers
 The Five People You Meet in Heaven
 Something the Lord Made
 The Wool Cap

Distinguished Career Achievement in Performing Arts Award
Tom Cruise

Statistics

References

Broadcast Film Critics Association Awards
2004 film awards